Emanuel Rubén Moreno (born 19 March 1990) is an Argentine professional footballer who plays as a midfielder for Quilmes.

Career
Moreno started his career with local club with Argentino Juniors, where he remained for eleven years until he joined for Sarmiento. 2009 saw Unión Santa Fe sign Moreno, with his professional bow arriving in the following year during a 2–2 draw at home to Instituto in Primera B Nacional on 8 May 2010. That sole appearance in 2009–10 was followed by three participations in 2010–11 as they won promotion to the Primera División. They returned to tier two two years later, with Moreno then netting his opening senior goals versus Instituto and Boca Unidos respectively. On 3 July 2014, Moreno joined Douglas Haig. Thirty-nine matches followed.

A further move to Los Andes was completed in January 2016, with Moreno subsequently appearing fifty-two times and scoring twice. Guillermo Brown of Primera B Nacional signed Moreno on 7 January 2018. Twelve games occurred in the rest of 2017–18, with his last one of the campaign being a goalless draw in April against Almagro. He left the club following the expiration of his contract on 30 June 2020. In August 2020, Moreno signed with Quilmes until the end of 2022.

Career statistics
.

References

External links

1990 births
Living people
People from Paraná, Entre Ríos
Argentine footballers
Association football midfielders
Primera Nacional players
Argentine Primera División players
Unión de Santa Fe footballers
Club Atlético Douglas Haig players
Club Atlético Los Andes footballers
Guillermo Brown footballers
Quilmes Atlético Club footballers
Sportspeople from Entre Ríos Province